During the Russo-Georgian War, demonstrations were held all over the world to protest the Russian invasion of Georgia. Manifestations were also held in support of Russia and the separatists of South Ossetia and Abkhazia. Pro-Georgian demonstrations received the largest turnout in the Baltic States, where thousands marched in protest, whereas large pro-Russia camps were observed in Russia and Serbia.

Protests against Russian involvement in Georgia

Protests supporting South Ossetia, Russia and/or Abkhazia

See also
 International reaction to the Russo-Georgian War

References

External links
"Russia-Georgia conflict: International protests", Picture Gallery at The Telegraph

Russo-Georgian War
Protests in Georgia (country)
2008 protests